Johan Sebastiaan Ploem HonFRMS (born 25 August 1927, Sawahlunto) is a Dutch microscopist and digital artist, who made significant contribution to the field of fluorescence microscopy.

Career

Ploem received his education at the University of Utrecht in the Netherlands, Harvard University and the University of Amsterdam. He has since then been employed by a number of academic institutions, including the University of Miami, Harvard, the University of Amsterdam, and the University of Leiden, where he served as a professor at the Faculty of Medicine. He also cooperated with industry, in particular in the branch of optics and concentrated on research in image analysis, participating in a project aiming to automate cancer cell recognition.

Ploem's prototype fluorescence epi-illuminators and microscopes form a part of the permanent exposition of the Dutch National Museum for the history of Science and Medicine.

Ploem described a new sub-category of digital art.  Transforming digital algorithms were used to create novel pictorial handwritings for digital painting.

Ploem is Professor Emeritus at Leiden University, the Netherlands. He is a graduate of Utrecht University, the Netherlands, receiving an MD in 1972. He worked as Intern in the Broussais Hospital (Paris, France) with Professor Pasteur Valery-Radot. In 1963, Dr. Ploem was elected a Fulbright Fellow for Study at the Harvard University School of Public Health, receiving a Master of Public Health degree Cum Laude in 1954. He obtained a Ph.D. degree in 1967 from the University of Amsterdam, the Netherlands. Professor Ploem has served as visiting lecturer or professor at various universities: Dundee. Scotland; University of Florida, USA; Monash University, Melbourne, Australia; University of Beijing, China; and at the Free University of Brussels, Belgium. In 1980, he was appointed to a professorship in the Department of Cytochemistry and Cytometry at Leiden University. He retired from that position in 1992. Numerous honors and awards have been bestowed on Professor Ploem. In 1976 he was elected to the honorary Fellowship of the Royal Microscopical Society, Oxford England. In 1977 he received a Fellowship to the Papanicolaou Cancer Research Institute in Miami, Florida, and in 1979 a Fellowship to the Institute for Cell Analysis at the University of Miami, Florida. In 1982, he was the co-recipient of the C. E. Alken Foundation Award, Switzerland. In 1993, he was elected as the first Honorary Member of the International Society for Analytical Cytology. In 1993, Professor Ploem held the Erica Wachtel Medal Lecture at the British Society for Clinical Cytology meeting. In 1994, the European Society for Analytical Cellular Pathology established a Conference Keynote “Ploem” Lecture for invited scientists at its future general meetings. The International Society of Analytical Cytology invited Professor Ploem to present its inaugural “Robert Hooke” lecture. In 1995, he was invited by the Royal Microscopical Society to give the inaugural CYTO lecture.

Reflection contrast microscopy

In 1973, at the Second Conference on Mononuclear Phagocytes held in Leiden, Ploem introduced an improvement to Interference Reflection Microscopy (IRM), which he called Reflection Contrast Microscopy (RCM). He also wrote a book chapter in the associated conference proceeding edited by Ralph van Furth. The improvement is the addition of crossed polarizers and a so-called "anti-flex objective", the combination of which further reduces stray light in an IRM microscope, allowing even better interference contrast. RCM is more commonly known as Reflection Contrast Interference Microscopy (RICM) today.

Fluorescence microscopy
Around 1962 Ploem started work in collaboration with Schott on the development of dichroic beam splitters for reflection of blue and green light for fluorescence microscopy using epi illumination. At the time of his first publication on fluorescence microscopy using epi illumination with narrow-band blue and green light, he was not aware of the development of a dichroic beam splitter for UV excitation with incident light by Brumberg and Krylova.

Personal life
Ploem was born on Sumatra, then part of the Dutch East Indies. He started painting as a small boy and was educated in drawing and painting in Maastricht, the Netherlands.

Awards
 Fellow of the Papanicolaou Cancer Research Institute
 C. E. Alken Foundation award
 Ernst Abbe medal and award of the New York Microscopical Society
 Erica Wachtel medal from the British Society for Clinical Cytology
 The first honorary member of the Society for Analytical Cytology
 Honorary fellow of the Royal Microscopical Society
 Honorary fellow of the New York Microscopical Society
 Honorary fellow of the Polisch Society of Surgery
 Honorary fellow of the German Society of Surgery.

Digital painting

Bas Ploem started painting as a small boy.  While still at secondary school he  attended an evening course in drawing and painting at the “Kunstnijverheidsschool Maastricht”.

Ploem's presence in Paris was important for his knowledge and interest in art since he could regularly visit his cousins in Paris, the painter Frits Klein and his son Yves. He visited the Kleins when Yves was making his first monochromes.

In the last years of his activities at the faculty of medicine at Leiden University, he concentrated on research in image analysis. He was asked to participate in a European project with the aim of automating cancer cell recognition using computer analysis. It concerned a collaborative project with the German optical company Leitz/Leica Microsystems, and the Institute for Mathematical Morphology in Fontainebleau, France. Together with a team, Professor Jean Serra at this institute had developed an image analysis method, now internationally known as ‘Mathematical Morphology’ (MM). With his experience as an analogue painter, Ploem  saw the possibility of also applying the methods of mathematical morphology to the creation of digital art   .

At the International Symposium on Mathematical Morphology in Amsterdam (1998), J.S Ploem presented a paper on the creation of computer graphics  with Mathematical Morphology, using for the first time, the transforming algorithms from the Fontainebleau group  for the creation of digital art. (Mathematical Morphology and its Applications to Image and Signal Processing,  Heijmans and Roerdink (Eds), Kluwer. 1098:  page 355:)  
Ploem described and developed methodology for the creation of transformational digital art.

Mountain flowers as the first topic for digital image analysis
His first digital graphics of nature scenes were shown in his exposition at a regional art centre in the Pyrenees (Ossega, June, 1997).

Ploem was probably the first person to systematically use mathematical morphology for the creation of digital art, Ploem's work attracted international attention and he was invited as a plenary speaker at an international mathematical conference in Amsterdam in 1998 to explain his new type of digital art. He also received an invitation to show his art work in an exposition at this conference. The organisers of this meeting asked Ploem to write a chapter on his novel technique for digital art in a book (Kluwer) that was published on the occasion of this meeting.

He was  invited  for a symposium on ‘Art et Science’ at the University of Caen, France (April, 2001). At the art exposition connected with this symposium, he presented 6 digital graphics that were dominated by chaotic transformations of rock art themes. A similar invitation was made by the University of Basel in Switzerland (April, 2002).

References

External links 
 
  Website Leiden Professors

1927 births
Living people
Microscopists
Dutch digital artists
Academic staff of Leiden University
People from Heerlen
Fellows of the Royal Microscopical Society
University of Amsterdam alumni
Utrecht University alumni
Harvard School of Public Health alumni
Dutch people of the Dutch East Indies